Deportivo Bluefields is a Nicaraguan football team.

Based in Bluefields at the country's Caribbean coast, the club has played in the Nicaraguan Premier Division, their most recent the 2008/2009 season.

Despite its economic difficulties it features a talented squad, and many of the star players in Nicaragua's top clubs like Real Esteli or Diriangen began their career at Bluefields.

Coaches
 José Nelson Lima (2006)

References

Football clubs in Nicaragua
1997 establishments in Nicaragua
Association football clubs established in 1997